Palakkad Lok Sabha constituency, once knows as Palghat constituency, is one of the 20 Lok Sabha (parliamentary) constituencies in the Indian state of Kerala.

Assembly segments
Palakkad Lok Sabha constituency is composed of the following assembly segments:

Members of Parliament

Madras State

Election results

General election 2019

General election 2014

General election 2009

General election 1962
 Kunhan Patinjara Veetilpadi (CPI) : 131,688 votes  
 V. Eacharan (Congress) : 59,353

See also
 Palghat
 Malappuram district
 List of Constituencies of the Lok Sabha
 Indian general election, 2014 (Kerala)

References

External links
 Election Commission of India: https://web.archive.org/web/20081218010942/http://www.eci.gov.in/StatisticalReports/ElectionStatistics.asp

Lok Sabha constituencies in Kerala
Politics of Palakkad district